This is a list of protected areas of the Comoros.

References

 
Comoros
protected areas